Pierre Sansot (9 June 1928, Antibes6 May 2005, Grenoble) was a French anthropologist and sociologist.

1928 births
2005 deaths
French anthropologists
Urban sociologists
20th-century anthropologists